Goliathus orientalis is a species of beetles belonging to the family Scarabaeidae.

Subspecies

 G. orientalis orientalis Moser, 1909
 G. orientalis usambarensis Preiss, 1933

Description

The body is broad and flat. Elytra are whitish with a complex pattern of black markings usually in the form of black rings. Pronotum (thoracic shield) usually shows large black longitudinal stripes or a large black area. This usual pattern may differ greatly in the subspecies. The head bears a  black Y-shaped horn  in males, used in battles with other males. Legs are long,  powerful, black. Despite its large body, these beetles fly well. They have a  large and membranous secondary pair of wings. When not in use, these wings are kept completely folded beneath the elytra. These beetles feed primarily on tree sap and fruits.

Life cycle
The larvae live in the soil and need a protein-rich diet, because they grow very quickly. Even under optimum conditions, the larvae take about 4 months to mature fully, which corresponds to the duration of the rainy season. When maximum size is reached, the larva constructs a pupal chamber in which it will undergo metamorphosis to the adult state. In this stage they spend most of the dry season, and the adult does not emerge before the rainy season.

Distribution and habitat
This species is present in the Democratic Republic of the Congo, Tanzania., Angola, and Zambia. It can be found in the savannah, in shady areas with trees. It can also be found sipping sap from certain trees in groups of 3 or more.

Gallery

In the pet trade
This species is extremely valued in captivity. Adults are generally wild caught rather than captive bred.

In captivity they may be fed on commercial cat and dog food. The pupal cell is made with sand, and larvae are generally reared on dog, fish or ferret food, as they do not consume dead leaf matter. They take approximately a year and a half to mature in captivity and wild individuals most likely take longer. They are prone to cannibalising other beetles of their or other species. In captivity the adults can live over a year, but in the wild life is probably much shorter.

References

Cetoniinae
Beetles of Africa
Beetles described in 1909